"Up All Night" is the debut single by English singer Alex Clare, released in December 2010. It is from his debut studio album The Lateness of the Hour. The song was written by Alex Clare and producers Diplo and Switch of Major Lazer and features addition production from Mike Spencer and co-writer Ariel Rechtshaid. It was first released on 9 December 2010 as a digital download in the United Kingdom. Remixes were later released digitally and physically on various vinyl formats. It has been used as the opening theme for the BBC science fiction show Class which is an official spin-off from Doctor Who.

Music video
The music video was first published through Alex Clare's YouTube channel on 10 November 2010. It is around three minutes in length and it was directed by Blake Claridge.

The video starts with three different people, two men and a girl, who wake up lying on the ground, after having passed out the previous night. Throughout the video, the girl is seen near a swimming pool, one of the men is seen running on a treadmill, and the other is seen playing the drums to the song. The video progresses to show how the three characters' actions led them to the beginning of the video.

Track listing

Charts

Credits and personnel
 Lead vocals – Alex Clare
 Songwriters – Alex Clare, Thomas Pentz, David Taylor, Ariel Rechtshaid
 Producers – Diplo, Switch
 Additional production – Ariel Rechtshaid, Mike Spencer
 Label: Island

Release history

References

2010 debut singles
2010 songs
Alex Clare songs
Island Records singles
Songs written by Ariel Rechtshaid
Song recordings produced by Diplo
Songs written by Diplo
Song recordings produced by Ariel Rechtshaid
Songs written by Switch (songwriter)